Christian Potel (born December 16, 1973 in Montfermeil, Seine-Saint-Denis) is a former French professional football goalkeeper.

He played on the professional level in Ligue 2 for FC Libourne-Saint-Seurin.

He played for AS Cannes in Coupe de la Ligue.

1973 births
Living people
People from Montfermeil
French footballers
Ligue 2 players
AS Cannes players
US Boulogne players
FC Libourne players
FC Mulhouse players
Olympique Noisy-le-Sec players
Association football goalkeepers
Footballers from Seine-Saint-Denis
AS Béziers (2007) players